Bobadilla is a municipality in the Province of La Rioja, Spain.

Municipalities in La Rioja (Spain)